Laneshaw Bridge is a civil parish in Pendle, Lancashire, England. It contains ten listed buildings that are recorded in the National Heritage List for England.  All of the listed buildings are designated at Grade II, the lowest of the three grades, which is applied to "buildings of national importance and special interest".  The parish contains the village of Laneshaw Bridge and the surrounding countryside.  Most of the listed buildings are houses, farmhouses and farm buildings.  The other listed buildings consist of a boundary stone, a public house, and a bridge.

Buildings

Notes and references

Notes

Citations

Sources

Lists of listed buildings in Lancashire
Buildings and structures in the Borough of Pendle